Gallop Hill is a mountain located in the Catskill Mountains of New York south-southwest of Franklin. Sherman Hill is located north-northeast and Loomis Mountain is located south-southeast of Gallop Hill.

References

Mountains of Delaware County, New York
Mountains of New York (state)